The Bear River is a river in northwestern British Columbia, Canada. It flows northwest into the Sustut River, which flows southwest into the upper Skeena River.

References

Rivers of British Columbia
Skeena Country
Cassiar Land District